Gephyrocapsa is a genus of haptophytes.

Species

Some species include:
G. caribbeanica
G. crassipons
G. ericsonii
G. kamptneri
G. muellerae
G. oceanica
G. ornata
G. protohuxleyi

External Links 
 Tessa Koumoundouros: Earth's Fluctuating Orbit May Be Impacting Evolution, New Evidence Suggests. sciencealert, 2 December 2021

References

Haptophyte genera